The 2010 Leinster Football Association Senior Cup, also known as the 2010 Leinster Senior Cup, was the 109th staging of the Leinster Senior Cup association football competition. The 2010 Leinster Senior Cup marked the return of the competition following a ten-year absence.

Twenty teams competed in the 2010 competition. The teams entered included the League of Ireland clubs affiliated to the Leinster Football Association, the top four clubs from the 2008–09 Leinster Senior League Senior Division and the two 2009 Leinster Junior Cup finalists. The 12 clubs from both the League of Ireland Premier Division and League of Ireland First Division automatically qualified for the first round of the competition while the eight clubs from the A Championship, Leinster Senior League and the Athletic Union League entered into a Preliminary Round.

The 2010 Leinster Senior Cup kicked off with the preliminary round on 26 January 2010 and concluded with the Final on 2 August 2010 when Shelbourne defeated Bray Wanderers 4–0 at the Carlisle Grounds, Bray.

Preliminary round

The draw for the Premliminary round took place on 13 January 2010.

First round

The draw for the first round took place on 13 January 2010.

Quarterfinals

The draw for the Quarter Finals took place on 10 March 2010.

Semifinals

The draw for the Semifinals took place on 6 May 2010.

Final

The draw for home advantage in the final took place on 23 July 2010.

References

External links
 Official website

4
Leinster Senior Cup (association football)